The Dutch Cup, better known in Dutch as the "Beker" or "Bekercompetitie", is the national ice hockey cup in the Netherlands. It was held from 1938 to 1939, and 1971-present.  The Dutch Cup is usually an autumn competition that precedes or runs simultaneously with the regular season of the BeNe League, the Dutch and Belgian semi-professional ice hockey league.  

The format of the Dutch Cup competition is determined before each season and can vary depending on the number of teams competing.  In 2011, the format consisted of:
 a 16-game preliminary round-robin, followed by
 a three-game playoff round-robin among the top four teams in the preliminary round
 a one-game final game among the top two teams from the playoff round.

In 2012-2013, the Cup competition was a knock-out competition of home-and-home series among the six Dutch teams of the Eredivisie and eight teams of the Eerste Divisie, the Netherlands' top amateur league. Since 2015, the Dutch Cup has been for the Dutch teams of the Beneliga, while the Belgian teams participate in their own Belgian Cup.

For most of its existence, the Dutch Cup has been a separate competition from the Dutch National Championship, which was determined in a playoff at the end of the season of the Eredivisie, the old Dutch hockey league. When the Eredivisie was merged with the Belgian hockey league to become the BeNe League in 2015-16, the Dutch Cup was retained as a separate tournament to decide the best Dutch team, while the BeNe League playoffs determine the BeNe League champions.

Champions
1938 : HHIJC Den Haag
1939 : AIJHC Amsterdam
1970 : Tilburg Trappers 2nd division
1971 : Tilburg Trappers 2nd division
1972 : Tilburg Trappers
1973 : Tilburg Trappers
1974 : Tilburg Trappers
1975 : Tilburg Trappers
1976 : Tilburg Trappers
1977 : Feenstra Verwarming Heerenveen
1978 : Feenstra Verwarming Heerenveen
1979 : Feenstra Flyers Heerenveen
1980 : De Bisschop Amsterdam
1981 : Feenstra Flyers Heerenveen
1982 : Feenstra Flyers Heerenveen
1983 : Feenstra Flyers Heerenveen
1984 : Feenstra Flyers Heerenveen
1985 : Deko Builders Amsterdam
1986 : Eindhoven Kemphanen
1987 : IJHC Rotterdam Panda's
1988 : BP Flyers Heerenveen
1989 : Spitman Nijmegen
1990 : Gunco Panda's Rotterdam
1991 : Gunco Panda's Rotterdam
1992 : Agpo Trappers Tilburg
1993 : Meetpoint Eaters Geleen
1994 : Couwenberg Trappers Tilburg
1995 : Couwenberg Trappers Tilburg
1996 : Fulda Tigers Nijmegen
1997 : CVT Keukens Trappers Tilburg
1998 : Pelgrim Flyers Heerenveen
1999 : Agio Huys Tijgers Nijmegen
2000 : Boretti Tigers Amsterdam
2001 : Diamant Trappers Tilburg
2002 : Formido Heerenveen Flyers
2003 : Boretti Tigers Amsterdam
2004 : Amsterdam Bulldogs
2005 : Amsterdam Bulldogs
2006 : Destil Trappers Tilburg
2007 : Amstel Tijgers Amsterdam
2008 : Destil Trappers Tilburg
2009 : Romijnders DAR Devils Nijmegen
2010 : Ruijters Eaters Geleen
2011 : Destil Trappers Tilburg
2012 : HYS The Hague
2013 : Destil Trappers Tilburg
2014 : Destil Trappers Tilburg
2015 : Destil Trappers Tilburg
2016 : UNIS Flyers Heerenveen
2017 : UNIS Flyers Heerenveen
2018 : HIJS Hockij Den Haag

External links
Nederlandse IJshockey Bond
TYSC Trappers History

National ice hockey cup competitions in Europe
Ice hockey competitions in the Netherlands